The Treo 270 was a dual-band GSM flip form factor smartphone made by Handspring. Released on May 31, 2002 for $499 with service contract, $699 without service contract, it was the fourth device in the Treo family. It featured a full keyboard and shipped with Palm OS version 3.5.2H. The 270 had a 160×160 color screen, 16 MB of internal memory and a 33 MHz DragonBall CPU.

During its development, the Treo 270 was codenamed "Atlanta".

The Treo 300 was a twin model marketed by Sprint identical to the 270 except for using cdmaOne instead of GSM and being provider-locked.

References 

Handspring mobile phones